Mehdiabad (also Romanized as Mehdīābād) is a village in Keshvari Rural District, in the Central District of Ilam County, Ilam Province, Iran. At the 2006 census, its population was 1,357, in 257 families. The village is populated by Kurds.

References 

Populated places in Ilam County
Kurdish settlements in Ilam Province